Canadian federal elections have provided the following results in the Laurentides, Outaouais and Northern Quebec.

Regional Profile
The Outaouais is one of the most federalist areas of Quebec outside of Montreal because of its close proximity to Ottawa and its concurrent large population of civil servants.  However, Northern Quebec and the Laurentides have long been strongly nationalist, a recipe for two decades of Bloc Québécois dominance. In a recent by-election were the Liberals temporally able to get the traditionally Bloquist riding of Temiscamingue, having previously gained the northern riding of Abitibi—Baie-James—Nunavik in 1997.  

Social Credit did well here from the 1960s through the 1970s, usually winning two or three seats; Réal Caouette, the main voice of Social Credit in the province, was from this area.  Hull—Aylmer was one of the few ridings outside the Montreal area that was not swept up in the Brian Mulroney tide, as it went Liberal in both 1984 and 1988; in 1984 it was one of only five Liberal-held ridings outside Montreal in the entire province.  The Liberals managed to retake Gatineau in 1988. In 2006, however, everything changed as Liberal support melted here; the party lost two of their three Outaouais seats – one to the Bloc and one to the Conservatives.

The region was swept up in the massive NDP tsunami that swept through Quebec in 2011, as the NDP took every seat here by considerable margins (9,000 votes or more), ousting the region's highest-profile MP, Foreign Affairs Minister Lawrence Cannon in Pontiac.  The NDP even snapped up Hull—Aylmer—a seat that had been in Liberal hands since the riding's creation in 1917.  In 2015, the Liberals took all of the Outoauais, and took four ridings in the Laurentides.  The Bloc took three Laurentides ridings, while the NDP was reduced to the two northernmost ridings in the province. The region reverted to type in 2019. The Bloc swept the north and took all but one seat in the Laurentides, while the Liberals maintained their sweep of the Outaouais and narrowly held onto one Laurentides seat.

Votes by party throughout time

2019 - 43nd General Election

2015 - 42nd General Election

2011 - 41st General Election

Maps

2008 - 40th General Election

2006 - 39th General Election

2004 - 38th General Election

Maps 

Abitibi-Témiscamingue
Argenteuil-Mirabel
Gatineau
Hull-Aylmer
Laurentides-Labelle
Nunavik-Eeyou
Pontiac
Rivière-des-Mille-Îles
Rivière-du-Nord
Terrebonne-Blainville

2000 - 37th General Election

1997 - 36th General Election

1993 - 35th General Election

1988 - 34th General Election

1984 - 33rd General Election

References 

Canadian federal election results in Quebec